Norman Longmate (15 December 1925 – 4 June 2016) was an English author and social and military historian.

He was educated at Christ's Hospital and  Worcester College, Oxford, where he read Modern History. Author of 31 books, and of various radio documentaries, he often worked as a historical adviser on TV programmes, including the BAFTA-award winning How We Used to Live. He was made a Fellow of the Royal Historical Society in 1981. Longmate died in June 2016 at the age of 90.

Works by Norman Longmate

Miscellaneous
 A Socialist Anthology (Phoenix House) 1953
 Oxford Triumphant (Phoenix House) 1954
 Writing for the BBC (BBC Publications) 1966 (1st edition) to 1988 (8th edition)

Detective Stories
 Death Won't Wash (Cassell) 1957
 A Head for Death (Cassell) 1958
 Strip Death Naked (Cassell) 1959, Garland Publishing, New York, 1989
 Vote for Death (Cassell) 1960
 Death in Office (Robert Hale) 1961

Careers Books
 Keith in Electricity (Chatto & Windus) 1961
 Electricity Supply (Sunday Times) 1961
 Electricity as a Career (Batsford) 1964

General Social History
 King Cholera: the Biography of a Disease (Hamish Hamilton) 1966
 The Waterdrinkers: a History of Temperance (Hamish Hamilton) 1968
 Alive and Well: Medicine and Public Health 1830 to the Present Day (Penguin Education) 1970
 The Workhouse (Temple Smith) 1974, (Pimlico) 2003
 Milestones in Working Class History (BBC Publications) 1975
 The Hungry Mills: the Story of the Lancashire Cotton Famine 1861-5 (Temple Smith) 1974
 The Breadstealers: the Fight Against the Corn Laws 1838-46 (Temple Smith) 1984 (St Martin's Press, New York) 1984

History of the Second World War
 How We Lived Then: a History of Everyday Life during the Second World War (Hutchinson) 1971, (Arrow Books) 1973,  (Pimlico) 2002
 If Britain Had Fallen (BBC Publications and Hutchinson) 1972; (Stein and Day, New York) 1974, (Arrow Books) 1975,  (Greenhill Books, London & Stackpole Books, Mechanicsburg, Philadelphia) 2004
 The Real Dad's Army: the Story of the Home Guard (Hutchinson) 1974, (Arrow Books) 1974, (Amberley) 2010
 The GIs: the Americans in Britain 1942-1945 (Hutchinson) 1975
 Air Raid: the Bombing of Coventry, 1940 (Hutchinson) 1976, (Arrow Books) 1978, (David McKay, New York) 1978
 When We Won the War: the Story of Victory in Europe, 1945 (Hutchinson) 1977
 The Doodlebugs: the Story of the Flying Bombs (Hutchinson) 1981, (Arrow Books) 1986
 Hitler's Rockets: the Story of the V2s (Hutchinson) 1982, (Pen & Sword Books) 2009
 The Bombers: the RAF Offensive Against Germany (Hutchinson) 1983, (Arrow Books) 1988
 The Home Front: an Anthology of Personal Experience 1938-1945. Edited with a Preface. (Chatto & Windus) 1986

General Military History
 Defending the Island: From Caesar to the Armada (Hutchinson) 1989, (Grafton Books) 1990,  (Pimlico) 2001
 Island Fortress: the Defence of Great Britain 1603-1945 (Hutchinson) 1991, (Grafton Books) 1993, (Pimlico) 2001

Autobiography
 The Shaping Season: an Author's Autobiography - Childhood and Schooldays (Fairford Press) 2000 & 2001

References

External links
 Jill Longmate, "Social historian who corresponded with Mary Whitehouse", Prospero: The newspaper for BBC pensioners'', issue 6, December 2016, page 11.

1925 births
2016 deaths
English historians
Alumni of Worcester College, Oxford
Fellows of the Royal Historical Society